China Star (Simp. Chinese: 中华之星, a.k.a. DJJ2) is an indigenously designed experimental high speed train manufactured in China. It is an EMU train developed from the DJJ1 "Blue Arrow" high speed train by Zhuzhou Electric Locomotive Works.

Overview
It consists of 2 power cars and 9 passenger cars. The prototype rolled out in 2002. However, due to signal system mismatches, and problems at electrical system and brake system, commercial services was delayed for the train. Such problems still persists in services and was discontinued in 2006.

Shenyang RB ceased services offered by "China Star" from August 2006. As of 2007, the train was sealed and placed at an unsheltered parking area of the depot.

One of its power car and three passenger cars were moved to China Railway Museum, becoming the first high speed train being displayed in the museum.

See also
 China Railway DJJ1
 China Railway DDJ1
 China Railway CR200J
 E1000 series

References

External links
 Product information (Zhuzhou)
 Product information (Datong)
 Video clip

High-speed trains of China
Electric multiple units of China
Zhuzhou locomotives
Electric multiple units with locomotive-like power cars